Alan Light (born August 4, 1966) is an American journalist who has been a rock critic for Rolling Stone and the editor-in-chief for Vibe, Spin, and Tracks.

Early life
Light grew up in Cincinnati, Ohio, where he attended Cincinnati Country Day School. His mother was a dance reviewer for the local newspaper. His father, Dr. Irwin Light, was a neotologist at Cincinnati Children's Hospital. He graduated from Yale University in 1988, majoring in American Studies, and wrote his senior thesis on Licensed to Ill by the Beastie Boys.

Career
Light had been an intern at Rolling Stone during their 20th anniversary year while still a student. He later joined the staff as a fact checker in 1989, becoming a senior writer in 1990. In 1993, he became the founding music editor of Vibe magazine, becoming editor-in-chief in 1994. In 1999 he became editor-in-chief for Spin magazine. He left Spin in March 2002 and founded the music magazine Tracks in 2003. He then worked as music reviewer on radio station WFUV, and served as music correspondent on NPR show Weekend America. He writes regularly for The New York Times.

Light has worked as consultant for the Rock & Roll Hall of Fame. He was a judge for the 4th Annual Independent Music Awards in 2005, and subsequently for the 11th, 12th and 13th Annual Independent Music Awards.
Starting in October 2016 Light is one of the mainstay hosts of the newly created Volume music talk channel on Sirius XM on the afternoon show Debatable.

Light has also been involved in assisting homeless people with the Housing Works AIDS charity.

After publication of his 2012 book The Holy or the Broken: Leonard Cohen, Jeff Buckley & the Unlikely Ascent of 'Hallelujah, Light served as consulting producer for the 2022 film Hallelujah: Leonard Cohen, A Journey, A Song.

Selected bibliography
Tupac Amaru Shakur: 1971–1996 (with Quincy Jones), 1998
The Vibe History of Hip Hop, 1999
The Skills to Pay the Bills: The Story of the Beastie Boys, 2006
My Cross To Bear (by Gregg Allman, with Alan Light), 2012
The Holy or the Broken – Leonard Cohen, Jeff Buckley, and the Unlikely Ascent of 'Hallelujah', 2012
Let's Go Crazy: Prince and the Making of Purple Rain, 2014

References

External links
Alan Light – Official Publisher Page – Simon & Schuster

Living people
American magazine editors
American music critics
Place of birth missing (living people)
American music journalists
Yale University alumni
Writers from Cincinnati
1966 births
Journalists from Ohio
20th-century American journalists
American male journalists
20th-century American male writers
21st-century American journalists
21st-century American male writers
WFUV people
Rolling Stone people